The women's +78 kg competition in judo at the 2018 Mediterranean Games was held on 29 June at the Cambrils Pavilion in Cambrils.

Schedule
All times are Central European Summer Time (UTC+2).

Results

Main Round

Repechage

References

External links
 

W79
2018
Mediterranean W79